The 1986 AMCU-8 men's basketball tournament was held March 6–8, 1986, at the Hammons Student Center at Southwest Missouri State University in Springfield, Missouri.

Cleveland State defeated  in the title game, 70–66, to win their first AMCU/Summit League championship. The AMCU-8 did not receive an automatic bid to the 1986 Tournament. However, the Vikings earned an at-large bid and made a run to the Sweet Sixteen.

Format
All eight conference members qualified for the tournament. First round seedings were based on regular season record.

Bracket

References

Summit League men's basketball tournament
1985–86 AMCU-8 men's basketball season
1986 in sports in Missouri
Sports in Springfield, Missouri